The Lesbian Avengers were founded in 1992 in New York City, the direct action group was formed with the intent to create an organization that focuses on lesbian issues and visibility through humorous and untraditional activism. The group was founded by six individuals: Ana Maria Simo, Anne Maguire, Anne-Christine D'Adesky, Marie Honan, Maxine Wolfe, and Sarah Schulman.

The founding members of the Avengers attempted to address the lack of visibility lesbians had throughout the media. Multiple members claimed that the lack of diversity and the focus on white men in the gay rights movement is one of the reasons that inspired them to create a movement for lesbians.

There were multiple chapters of the Lesbian Avengers within different cities such as: New York, San Francisco, and Denver. Different chapters of the Lesbian Avengers expanded their missions to focus on issues of race, class, and gender. The Lesbian Avengers engaged in different forms of activism. One of the most notable accomplishments is the formation of the annual Dyke March. Other notable forms of activism include fire-breathing and protests against Proposition 8.

Though some groups continue to hold demonstrations on an irregular basis (San Francisco Avengers demonstrated against Proposition 8), one of the Lesbian Avengers' most enduring legacy may be the annual Dyke March.

Origins

Founding
The Lesbian Avengers was founded by six women: Ana Maria Simo, Anne Maguire, Anne-Christine D'askey, Marie Honan, Maxine Wolfe, and Sarah Schulman. Each of these women had experience in advocating for gay rights and equality under different organizations such as ACT-UP and the Irish Lesbian and Gay Organization (ILGO). The co-founders sought to create an inclusive movement that focused on lesbian issues, something they felt was not properly addressed in other organizations.

Their first recruiting flyer, handed out at New York's Pride March, invited "LESBIANS! DYKES! GAY WOMEN!" to get involved. "We're wasting our lives being careful. Imagine what your life could be. Aren't you ready to make it happen?"

The Lesbian Avenger handbook was an important foundation that gave the Avengers their ability to organize meetings, fundraise, and responses to media. The handbook "made it possible for lesbians across the world to start Avenger chapters without having a huge pool of experienced activists." The handbook played an essential role in the organization and was a tool used by the experienced and newcomers of the group.

Growth
The New York chapter started with an estimated 50 members. Eventually new chapters were introduced in multiple locations, over 35 chapters emerged worldwide. A handful chapters were present internationally. The Avengers garnered attention through their use of demonstrations, which were combined with flyers and memorable catchphrases. The Lesbian Avengers designated members to focus on different tasks such as event organizing and designing flyers for events. A notable artist within the group was Carrie Moyer, an American painter who designed some the posters and logos used by the group.

In 1993, the documentary film The Lesbian Avengers Eat Fire, Too was released. The film documents the first year of activity within the group and includes interviews with the members of the New York chapter.

Actions

The  encouraged particular attention to the visual elements of the demonstration. "It should let people know clearly and quickly who we are and why we are there. NY Avengers have used a wide range of visuals such as fire eating, a twelve-foot shrine, a huge bomb, a ten-foot plaster statue, flaming torches, etc. The more fabulous, witty, and original, the better."

Sometimes their positions seem to change, as well.  In the early years, the group opposed attempts to legitimize gay marriage, protesting the notion at an Andrew Sullivan book signing in 1995.

The New York Lesbian Avengers also developed a Lesbian Avenger Civil Rights Organizing Project.

First Action: Rainbow Curriculum
On their first action (September 9, 1992), the Lesbian Avengers targeted right-wing attempts to suppress a multicultural "Children of the Rainbow" curriculum for elementary schoolchildren. Ostensibly under attack for including lesbians and gay men in its lessons about diversity, some activists like Ana Maria Simo charged that opponents, besides being homophobic, also had a racist agenda in battling the multicultural curriculum.

Meeting in Queens School District 24 where the opposition to the "Rainbow Curriculum" was strongest, they paraded through the neighborhood with an all-lesbian marching band to a local elementary school where they gave out lavender balloons to children and their parents saying "Ask About Lesbian Lives". They also wore tee-shirts reading, "I was a lesbian child".

This first action exemplified the Avenger approach.

They also demonstrated without permits, refusing to ask for permission to express themselves. Organizer Kelly Cogswell later elaborated on this principle during the 1994 International Dyke March, "We ask for a permit; they can say no."

Above all, their choice of action reflected their commitment to challenging homophobic stereotypes. In this case, some members objected to going anywhere near children since lesbians and gay men had so often been portrayed as child molesters. Other members thought that was precisely why their presence was essential. And that was the eventual consensus of the group.

Role of Media: Love and Hate
Press played an important role in the Lesbian Avengers. One article characterized them as "a protest outfit formed to attract media attention to lesbian causes." Besides shaping actions for visual impact, there were committees dedicated to outreach and "propaganda". The handbook offered a step by step guide on the processes necessary to attract press attention from mainstream and lesbian and gay media, even examples of press releases.

Conflicts over the handling of the press coverage of the Dyke March also occurred within the New York gay and lesbian political community. In an interview, Simo said that a press release sent out by the Gay and Lesbian Alliance Against Defamation (GLAAD) after Stonewall 25 initially did not have anything in it about the Dyke March. After the Avengers brought this issue to GLAAD's attention, one line was added to the end of the press release about the lack of mainstream press coverage about the Dyke March.Branner, Amy C. There was a dyke march? Off Our Backs, Aug. 1994  

Aware of the power of the press, the Lesbian Avengers sometimes didn't court it, but attacked it. They invaded the offices of Self magazine when that publication planned a trip to Colorado despite a lesbian and gay boycott of the state for hate legislation, and in the resulting media coverage were misnamed "The Lesbian Agenda."

The Avengers also collaborated with Las Buenas Amigas and African Ancestral Lesbians United for Societal Change in a series of actions against homophobic and racist radio programs at La Mega 97.9 in New York, and its parent company, the Spanish Broadcasting System, informing advertisers, staging demonstration, and briefly taking over the radio station and broadcasting their own message.

Fire-Eating
Use of fire and fire-eating became something of a symbol for the Lesbian Avengers, and spread from the New York group to many others. The first time the Avengers engaged in fire-breathing was on October 30, 1992, in New York. This was done in honor of Hattie Mae Cohens and Brian Mock, to "...transform the image of their deaths by learning to eat fire." The New York Times, in one of its few articles on the Avengers, explained:

[It] grew out of tragedy. Last year, a lesbian and a gay man, Hattie Mae Cohens and Brian Mock, burned to death in Salem, Ore., after a Molotov cocktail was tossed into the apartment they shared. A month later, on Halloween, at a memorial to the victims in New York City, the Avengers (then newly organized) gave their response to the deaths. They ate fire, chanting, as they still do: "The fire will not consume us. We take it and make it our own.

At the Washington Dyke March held during the anniversary celebrations of the Lesbian and Gay March on Washington in 1993, the Lesbian Avengers ate fire in front of the White House surrounded by a crowd of an estimated 20,000 lesbians.

The Dyke March
According to co-founder Sarah Schulman, "It was at the 1993 March on Washington that the Avengers and ACT-UP Women's Network created the first Dyke March -- with 20,000 women, marching together with no permit. These participants brought the marches home to their cities and countries and created a new tradition."

The first Dyke March was initiated by the San Francisco Lesbian Avengers chapter in 1993, it was done during the 1993 March on Washington. Around 20,000 lesbians attended the first march. Eventually, the New York chapter followed and began holding their own Dyke march. The march was held in Washington, the success of the initial march led to marches across other cities such as: New York, West Hollywood, Chicago, and many more locations nationally and internationally.  Currently, the marches still exist and are held in June and are done in honor of the Stonewall riots and other notable events in LGBT history.

Chapters

New York Chapter 
The New York Chapter was the beginning of the Lesbian Avengers. The Avengers in New York worked from 1992 to 1995, their last action involved protesting comments Jospeh Bruno made toward the LGBT community. The first official action of the New York Lesbian Avenger Chapter was a protest against right-wing opposition to New York's Rainbow Curriculum. The Avengers marched on the first day of classes in opposition to those who refused to the curriculum. Many of the actions taken by the New York Chapter were in relation to politicians who made homophobic remarks, actions to increase lesbian visibility, and volunteer work across different organizations.

The New York Chapter partnered with The New York City Anti-Violence Project (AVP) to protest the violence that queer people were faced with during Halloween Celebrations. Additionally, much of the activism the Avengers engaged in addressed the murders of gay people. Their first protest was in regard to the murders of two gay people, Hattie Mae Cohens and Brian Mock. The avengers held a press conference in Manhattan City Hall to bring awareness to the situation.

San Francisco Chapter 
The San Francisco Chapter of the Lesbian Avengers was founded in 1993 and actively engaged in different forms of activism until 1997. The San Francisco chapter is responsible for creating the biggest avenger event, The Dyke March. According to co-founder Kelly Cogswell, the march mobilized approximately 20,000 lesbians and the success of the event led to the opening of around 60 new chapters.

Another major action the Avengers took was in response to Exodus International and their use of conversion therapy. On February 9, 1995, a group of five avengers entered the headquarters and proceeded to demonstrate against the organization. The Avengers came with posters and began chanting in the building. The Avengers brought 1,000 crickets, which they released into the headquarters, causing alarm among from members of Exodus International.

The issues that this chapter targeted varied. They held protests, brought awareness to the AIDS crisis, and organized events to mobilize lesbians.

International Chapters 
The Lesbian Avengers grew outside of the borders within the United States. There were chapters located within different cities in Canada, Europe, and Australia. The most well-known international chapter was located in London, England. Members of the London chapter were also ex members of the group OutRage! Members of the London chapter would focus on different issues, many of their actions aimed to increase lesbian visibility. Members re-created Romeo and Juliet will a full lesbian cast and protested homophobic groups and organizations across London. Despite the presence of international chapters, the documented activity of these chapters are limited.

See also
 Human Rights Campaign
 Lesbian erasure
 Off our backs

References

Further reading
 Cogswell, Kelly. Eating Fire: My Life As a Lesbian Avenger Univ Of Minnesota Press, 2014. Memoir. Spanning the years from the Nineties Culture Wars to the War on Terror, the first half is a description of the rise and fall of the New York Lesbian Avengers, the second, after she becomes a citizen journalist, offers a more nuanced look at the Avengers in the larger context of social change, identity politics, and civil liberties. 
 Documentary Film: Lesbian Avengers Eat Fire, Too Editors Janet Baus, Su Friedrich. (1993). Most important resource. Covers the first year of the New York Lesbian Avengers, offers footage of all actions, as well as interviews with many of the members, explaining the attraction of the group and what it meant to them. Available through Outcast Films.
 The Lesbian Avengers Handbook Explains how the Lesbian Avengers functioned. At least ideally.
 Lesbian Avenger Civil Rights Organizing Project: Out Against the Right Handbook
 Schulman, Sarah. My American History: Lesbian and Gay Life During the Reagan/Bush Years Routledge, 1994.
 Atkins, Robert. Girls With Wheatpaste And Webspace An interview with artists and former Avengers Carrie Moyer and Sue Schaffner about their work as DAM! (Dyke Action Machine!) Offers insight into two of the Avengers' image makers.

External links
 
  Twin Cities Avengers

1992 establishments in New York City
Feminism in New York City
Feminist organizations in the United States
Lesbian culture in New York (state)
LGBT organizations based in New York City
Lesbian feminist organizations
Lesbian organizations in the United States
LGBT political advocacy groups in New York (state)
Organizations established in 1992
1992 in LGBT history
Lesbian history in the United States